WWHX is an FM radio station on 100.7 MHz at Normal, Illinois.  It received its license on January 10, 2006, and began its previous Rhythmic Top 40 format with the name Hot 100.7 on April 1, 2018.  The station is a Neuhoff Media through licensee Neuhoff Media Bloomington, LLC.

History
100.7 signed on in August 2005 as WVMG with an adult contemporary format known as Magic 100.7.  Magic signed on as a direct competitor to Star 107.7, but had a better signal within Bloomington/Normal.  The station had modest success but was able to eventually drive competitor Star 107.7 out of the format in 2007.  Throughout its years as an AC station it flipped to a Christmas format every November around Thanksgiving.  The station hired Fasig, a known talent from WBNQ as a morning host.  In March 2012, then-owner Connoisseur Media pulled the plug on Magic and flipped to a CHR format as Hits 100.7.

The station continued to air a contemporary hit radio format until April 1, 2018, when it switched to a Rhythmic CHR format with the branding "Hot 100.7: The Beat of BloNo", with the first song being "Hot in Herre" by Nelly.

On November 1, 2021, WWHX dropped its Rhythmic CHR format and began stunting with Christmas music as "100.7 - Bloomington-Normal's Christmas Station".

On January 1, 2022, the station switched to a hot adult contemporary format branded as "Now 100.7", with the first song being "Take Me to Church" by Hozier.

Previous logo

References

External links

WHX
Hot adult contemporary radio stations in the United States
Radio stations established in 2005
2005 establishments in Illinois